Valery Douglas Pajetat (born 17 February 1986) is a Cameroonian footballer who played as a goalkeeper for English club Haringey Borough.

On 19 October 2019, an FA Cup qualifying match between Haringey Borough and Yeovil Town was abandoned after Yeovil fans were accused of racially abusing Pajetat, including spitting and throwing a bottle at him. Haringey's defender Coby Rowe was also targeted. Both teams walked off the pitch. No individual was charged in relation to the incident.

References

External links

1986 births
Living people
Footballers from Yaoundé
Cameroonian footballers
Association football goalkeepers
Primeira Liga players
Liga Portugal 2 players
Segunda Divisão players
Renaissance FC de Ngoumou players
S.C. Pombal players
C.D. Nacional players
S.C. Freamunde players
C.D. Feirense players
S.C. Espinho players
F.C. Famalicão players
Margate F.C. players
Haringey Borough F.C. players
Cameroonian expatriate footballers
Expatriate footballers in Portugal
Expatriate footballers in England
Cameroonian expatriate sportspeople in Portugal
Cameroonian expatriate sportspeople in England
National League (English football) players